ISI Dangkor Senchey Football Club is a Cambodian professional football club based in the capital of Phnom Penh. Founded in 2016, The club competes in the Cambodian Premier League, the top division of Cambodian football, following promotion from the Cambodian League 2 in 2022 season. Formerly a semi-professional team, the club upgraded itself to be a professional and took part in Cambodian Second League.

History
Formed in 2016, ISI Dangkor Senchey has always had their eyes set on entering the professional stage. After building their program and establishing themselves as a top team at the semi-professional level, they are ready to climb to the next level. “We dreamed about playing professionally, but we needed to build our foundations first. We’ve been preparing and, now with a strong community and good structure under the KMH Foundation, we are ready,” said Mr. Siek.

KMH Academy
The KMH Academy, a part of ISI GROUP's KMH Foundation, is a football training academy that seeks to improve youth access to sports, help players develop personally and academically, as well as build professional sports in Cambodia. The KMH Foundation organizes Cambodia's largest semi-professional tournaments, including the KMH Champions League. The young players who are cultivating their skills through the KMH Academy have access to the KMH U18 CUP and KMH Champions League as they push through the ranks, offering huge opportunity for their professional development.

‍

Current squad

Achievement
2020 Cambodian Second League: 4th place.

2022 Cambodian League 2: Runner up.

References

Cambodian Second League
Football clubs in Cambodia
2016 establishments in Cambodia